Tri County Public Schools is a school district headquartered in unincorporated Jefferson County, Nebraska, south of DeWitt. The district serves DeWitt, Plymouth, and Swanton, as well as other unincorporated areas in Jefferson, Saline, and Gage counties. The district operates Tri County Elementary School and Tri County Jr/Sr High School.

 the district has 402 students and 73 employees.

History
The district formed in 1966 as a consolidation of various school districts.

References

External links
 Tri County Public Schools
 Tri County District Map
School districts in Nebraska
Education in Gage County, Nebraska
Education in Jefferson County, Nebraska
Education in Saline County, Nebraska
1966 establishments in Nebraska
Educational institutions established in 1966